The Czechoslovak Cup was a football cup competition held in Czechoslovakia. It was officially created in 1960 and folded in 1993 with the split between Czech Republic and Slovakia.

The cup was played throughout Czechoslovakia until 1968–69. From 1969–70, the cup was played between the winners of Czech Cup and Slovak Cup.

Sparta Prague and Dukla Prague were the most successful clubs winning both 8 times. In total, Czech teams lifted the Cup 20 times, and Slovak teams 13 times.

The origins of the cup are in unofficial tournaments played in 1950–51, 1951–52, 1955 and 1959–60 season.

Finals

Winners
 Dukla Prague 8
 Sparta Prague 8 (including as Spartak Sokolovo)
 Slovan Bratislava 5
 Spartak Trnava 4
 Baník Ostrava 3
 Lokomotíva Košice 2
 DAC Dunajská Streda 1
 1. FC Košice 1
 FC Tescoma Zlín 1 (as TJ Gottwaldov)

See also
 Czechoslovak First League
 Czech Cup
 Slovak Cup
Czechoslovak Supercup, de facto revival as a friendly between the Czech and Slovak cup winners post-dissolution

External links
 Full tables on RSSSF

Cup
Recurring sporting events established in 1960
Recurring sporting events disestablished in 1993
1960 establishments in Czechoslovakia